Pomayrols is a commune in the Aveyron department in southern France.

Geography
The commune lies on the southern slope of the high valley of the Lot river, between the cities of Saint-Laurent-d'Olt and Saint-Geniez-d'Olt.

Its land area  is 2,340 hectares (in the shape of a triangle); its altitude varies from 433 metres in La Tourre with 1,180 metres at the "Puech of the Blackbird".

Its northeastern limit touches the department of Lozère with the commune of Trélans. It follows the old track "drailhe" which was used by the pilgrims of the Way of St. James and is now GR footpath n° 6 which connects Le Puy-en-Velay to Conques.

In southeast, from the ravine of the Drop to Puech Grond is used as limit with the commune of Saint-Laurent-d'Olt.

In the south, runs the Lot river which goes down from Saint-Laurent-d'Olt; it separates the commune with that from La Capelle-Bonance.

The river is used as border between two extremely different natural areas: mounts of Aubrac in north, large plateaus in the south.

In the southwest, the road on right bank of the brook of Bonance (known as "Canto Serp") borders the commune of Saint-Geniez-d'Olt.

In the northwest the commune is separated from that of Aurelle-Verlac by a line which passes under Ginestes, Molière and Fraïssinède.

Localities and hamlets
Names of villages, farms and hamlets located on the territory of the commune in French and Occitan, with translation and origin.

Pomayrols, (Pomairòls): place with the many apple trees, comes from Latin poma, pomum: apple.

Chipole, (Gipola), "at Gipou" place which belongs to Joseph (Latin origin);
La Tourre, Torre: the tower, in Latin turris: the tower.
Vialaneuve, (the viala nova): the new way or new villa, from Latin via: the way.
La  Bessière, ( becièra ): planted place of birches, from Latin betullus: birch.

Le Monna
Les Gandalgues
La Fage, ( the Fagia, in the past, the Clara Fagia): clearing of beeches, in Latin fagus/fagea: beech.
Bonance
Rouveret, (Roveret): plantation of oaks; place planted of reopen (oaks): from Latin robur: reopen.
Les Vergounhoux, (los Vergonhôs): the vergogneux ones (humble and modest shy persons) in Latin vergonha: timidity.
Lespinasse (the espinassa): where there are thorn-bushes, in Latin spina: spine.
Le Flourigués (florigués): flowered place, in Latin flor: flower.
La Boulesq, (the bolesc): place or house belonging to "Ball" (Latin origin).
Falguières, (will falguièras): ferns, in Latin filicaria: fern.
Les Crouzets, (los crosets): the small hollows, come from Celtic the kris, then in popular Latin crosus: hollow.
Le Martinesq (lo Martinesc): place or house which belongs to Martin (Latin origin).
La Plagne, (the planha): flat place, in Latin planea: plain.
Les Pougettes
La Bourgade, (the borgada): the village, comes from Germanic, burg: city.

Les Gandalgues
The farms and hamlets located on left bank of the Lot river forming are added part of the parish of Pomayrols:

In the commune of Capelle-Bonance:
La Prade
Pomiès
Navechs
Le Gibertès
Le Laus

In the commune of Saint-Geniez-in Olt:
Cayzac (Caïsac): place pertaining to "Caïus" (Latin origin).

(Sources: Al Canton of Feels-Ginièis, departmental mission of the culture)

Nature

Landscapes

The formerly cultivated slopes made place with the wood of oaks or chestnuts intersected with natural meadows.

On the heights, the moors of heathers were gradually replaced by vast meadows and fields of cereals.

On the commune, since the 1970s, the farmers forsook little by little the slopes with the profit heights easier to exploit.

If this change is not without incidences on the quality of surrounding spring waters, at the bottom of the valley on the other hand, this evolution allowed to see developing vast areas with the passing of years where nature took again its rights for the greatest benefit of the flora and fauna.

On along the river, this new situation does not make forget the maintenance of the banks in order to reduce the devastators effects of the risings.

Natura 2000 setting

To preserve biodiversity in the high valley of the Lot, the area between the cities of Espalion and Saint-Laurent-d'Olt was included in the Natura 2000 network.

In Pomayrols, on right bank of the river, the grounds located under the  road n° 509 starting from the place known as:"Le Gravas" to the limit of  Saint Laurent  are indexed by the Général council of Aveyron as  a sensitive natural area .

History

Before the French Revolution, the castle and its land had successively belonged to several families of former Nobility.

Rights and duties of the lord of the manor of Pomayrols:
The Lord of the Manor  had on his field (Manorialism) the duty to ensure peace and safety for the people.
In order  to maintain the  peace, he had the legal authority, the right to make "the high, middle and low justice".

To show this capacity, he was allowed to draw up one or several Gibbet. (In French this right was called: right of fork).
In Pomayrols, the gibbet was located at the cross of the stake (formerly a much attended crossing point).
To ensure the safety of the goods and the people, he had to maintain men trained with the use of the weapons.

These expenses were financed by the perception of taxes and various royalties such as (Censive, Champart, Lods_&_sales and commun run of peace).
Because of the scarcity of currency, these taxes were paid either in food products or in day's works ( Corvée).
These local taxes resulting from Feudalism  would be applied until August 4, 1789.

Cayrodes 1261–1408
In 1261, the seigniory belonged to the family of Cayrodes, Pons de Cayrodes (Étienne de Cayrodes'son) was the first of this line.

(the pact of marriage of Guillemette the Pons de Cayrodes' sister going back to 1261 is the oldest document which mentions the existence of the castle of Pomayrols.)

In 1360, by the Treaty of Brétigny, a great part of the South-west of France including Rouergue was annexed to Guyenne which was already an English possession since 1259.

Pomayrols from now on was located at the border with close Gévaudan remained with the crown of France. The Black Prince troops  set up  a regular monitoring of this new border.

Between 1361 and 1369, an English garrison occupied the châtellenie of La Roque Valzergues  close to Saint Saturnin de Lenne.

(Witness of this disturbed time, the rock of the English, " Lo ròc dels Anglés" in occitan language.

This large rock drawn up on the Southern slope of the small valley of the Cazette holds its name for the time when these soldiers who moved in hostile environment, used it as place of sheltered and made safe bivouac).

In 1408, Hugues de Cayrodes tested the field in favour of the marquis de Laromiguière a close relation of his family.

Laromiguiere 1408–1452
In 1425, always during the Hundred Years' War, at the beginning of the reign of the king Charles VII of France, Loîse (Louise) of Laromiguière married Aymeric de Montamail which taken the name and armorial bearings of Laromiguière.

In 1452, Gabrielle their daughter, married Bérard Murat de Lestang which engaged for him and its, to keep the armorial bearings of Laromiguière.

Murat de Lestang 1452–1687
Among the lords of Rouergue, the family Murat de Lestang was during the 15th and 16th century, one of the most powerful of the county.

The Pomayrols line:

Gabrielle de Laromiguière: heiress of Pomayrols, Cambon, La roque Sainte Marguerite, and Bozouls in Rouergue as well as Montamat close to Raulhac  in Auvergne.

Bérard Murat de Lestang:  Rider and chamberlain of the king Louis XI of France.

He was named by the king with the command of the military forterress of Usson in Auvergne.

Gabrielle and Bérard (Bernard) had three children, Antoine, Pierre and Gabriel.

Gabriel Murat de Lestang: Knight Hospitaller of saint John of Jerusalem, that the History indicates under the name of Commander of Pomayrols.

He illustrated itself, with his friends in arms by its bravery at the time of the defense of the fortress of Rhodes besieged by Suleiman the Magnificent in 1522, under the reign of Francis I of France. Of return in France it managed the commandery of Saint Jean of Toulouse.

Antoine Murat de Lestang: Rider of the king Charles VIII of France.  Married in 1504, with Marquise, the daughter of Guillaume, Baron of Estaing, without children, he bequeathed Pomayrols to Pierre his brother.

Pierre Murat de Lestang: Married during the alive one of Antoine with Marie , heiress of the castle of Labastide - Teulat, they bequeathed Pomayrols to François their son.

François Murat de Lestang: Married in 1541, with Anne, the daughter of Antoine,  Lord of  Valzergues and  Naussac,
they bequeathed Pomayrols to Antoine their son.

It was at that time, on February 15, 1568, during the French Wars of Religion, under the reign of  the king Charles IX of France, that the castle and the church of the village were plundered and ransacked.

Huguenot revolts, come from Millau, sowed terror through Rouergue.

They were caught of it more particularly to the members clergy and with the goods of the catholic Church. Learning that in the castle of Pomayrols, had been stored harvests but especially of the pieces of furniture and the objects of great values of the churches of Saint-Geniez, they went there to take it by storm, in spite of the walls, the attackers in excess did not have any difficulties of taking the " local Fort Knox".

The castle was plundered and set fire to. The six priests who had the guard of the parochial goods were carried out by the sword.

In same time, learning that moniales were with the monastery of Fage, the plunderers went up there at once.

Alerted this threat, the moniales fled towards Saint-Geniez by the valley, they were refugièrent in the hermitage of Saint-Pierre (near to the current vault of the boxwood).

They will remain there until May 17, 1586, this day there, Saint Geniez d' Olt was again attacked by the troops of the Protestant Reformation, the churches were plundered and set fire to, the hermitage of Saint Pierre  located near to the borough undergoes the same fate, unhappy young women whom the History will retain under the name of Ladies of Pomayrols, all were massacred.

Antoine Murat de Lestang 2nd of the name: Married on June 18, 1581, Jeanne, the only daughter of Antoine de Bérail the Lord of Paulhac, Caylus, Belpech and other places. Antoine dies "of violent death" on September 26, 1613. (He will be the last Lord to have resided permanently at the castle). He bequeathed Pomayrols to Claude his son.

Claude Murat de Lestang: Gentleman with the room of the king Louis XIII of France. It married on November 14, 1615, Gabrielle, the daughter of Jean, Sénéchal and Governor of Toulouse, Lord of Valette and other places. They gave birth to three children: Jean, Marie and François. They Bequeathed Pomayrols to Jean.

Jean Murat de Lestang: Married on March 20, 1664, Anne-Marthe, the daughter of Louis, Lord of Brunet, Vicomte of Ambialet, Panat and other places. They had three children: François, Anne and Marie. They bequeathed Pomayrols to François their elder son.

François Murat de Lestang: Without children, it bequeathed Pomayrols to Anne her sister.

On October 5, 1687, Anne Murat de Lestang married Jean Baptist Deroux de la Loubière, thus was completed the line of Murat de Lestang with Pomayrols.

Deroux de la Loubiere 1687 - 1754
In 1754, Jean Baptist DeRoux (2nd of the name) tested the field of Pomayrols in favour of his nephew  Jean Baptist Dupont de Ligonnes

Dupont of Ligonnes 1754 - 1789
After the year 1800, Charles Gabriel Dupont de Ligonnès, his son, sold the castle (which for lack of maintenance was in state of advanced decay) to Mr. Aymar de Jabrun.

Sources: The gold Book of Pomayrols, Maury printer S.A, 4E quarter 1982.

History of Rouergue, Editions Privat 1987,

Administration

 Successive mayors since 1900

Population

Demography under the Ancien Régime:

Since the 14th century, the bishops of Rodez are held to make at least once during their mandate, the round of inspection of each parish.

About 1515, the parish of Pomayrols (which included La Boulesq and Falguières) counted 1200 inhabitants including 400 in the borough.

During the 18th century, under the reign of  the king Louis XV of France, the result of the inspections of 1746 and 1771 teach us that the population which lived in Pomayrols turned around a thousand of inhabitants (900 in 1746, 1090 in 1771, including 341 in the borough).

Demography during 19th and 20th centuries:

In 1874 the commune counted 1107 inhabitants. 479 on the parish of Pomayrols, 378 around Boulesq and Falguières, 250 around Fage.

From the 16th until at the end of the 19th century, the population of the valley thus remained relatively stable.

Marriage certificates on the commune and parish of Pomayrols to the 19th century.

According to the data base of the F.N.A.A

Since the end of the 19th century, the migrations (towards Paris or others towns and South America too) noted on the whole of Massif central area  did not save the commune.

In 1914, it counted only 600 inhabitants. Between 1914 and 1918, the First World War left 61 victims among the men in age to found a family, accentuating the depopulation.

Nowadays, the commune is characterized by the doubling of its population in the summer.

According to INSEE, in 2017, the commune counted 145 dwellings, of which 41% were main residences, 57% were second homes and 1% were vacant.

Religious heritage

John the Baptist church

The church is located at the bottom of the village, with the arrival of the path which used to be called "the coast of the Lords".

The building existed from the very start of the 11th century.

In 1050, under the reign of Henry I of France, Hugues de Calmont, bequeathed it to the abbey of Conques which will manage it during more than three centuries. The village was used as stage for the pélerins of  the Way of St. James, which went from Puy in Velay to Conques.

On February 28, 1390, the abbey of Conques yields the administration of the church and its Priory to the diocese of Rodez.
In 1452, Bérard Murat de Lestang, undertook its rebuilding.

(the side chapel of the rosary where it puts back beside Gabrielle his wife is the only part of the church who remains us of this time).

Partly burned in 1568 during the wars of religion, the church was raised returned peace. Three centuries later, between 1840 and 1900,  the church was gradually restored: the vault in 1840, interior parts in 1852, the bell-tower in 1855.

The Saint Peter cross

(Located near to the borough of Pomayrols at the turning of the lane which leads to Bonance).

It is a very beautiful cross cut out of limestone where figure in low relief Peter  the apostle and on which one you can read the following inscription: " FEV Marie Veisset de Bonance founder of this cross. A lord' s Prayer and a Maria ave. Requiescant in pace. Amen." Pierre Flovrou that it did it the year 1740.

Opposite the current cross, there was a small vault also dedicated to Saint Peter who had been built in 1544 per Pierre Murat de Lestang.

The chapel of the calvary

Its frontage cuts out on the peak of the hill to a few hundred meters of the borough of Pomayrols.

It was built in 1788 by the  Marie and Christine Massabuau. In ruin one century afterwards, it was raised in 1880 by the inhabitants of the village (owners of the building) In 1988, at the time of its bicentenary, it was restored on the initiative of the Parisians friendly society.

Mary Magdalene Church

Located near to the hamlet of  La Fage, sheltered with the hollow of a small valley, the church existed since the 10th century.

In 1082, it was given by Pons of Etienne (bishop of Rodez between 1079 and 1095) to the abbey Saint Victor of Marseilles .

In 1144, the pope Lucius II confirmed this donation.

About 1550, the two daughters of Pierre Murat de Lestang lord of Pomayrols founded a monastery there. In 1568, during the wars of religion, the buildings were partly destroyed.

In 1700 the church was set up in parish. The priests resident will follow one another it to the 20th century (1931).

During the 19th century, work of restoration was undertaken by the fabric committee and the parishioners to preserve the building of the bad weather.

In 1879, a part of the church was repaired as well as the presbytery.

In 1892, the rough-casting of the walls.

The side Romance vault constitutes the only vestiges which remain us of preceding building.

Saint Roch Church in La-Boulesq

Located on the Southern slope of the valley, in the medium of the charming village of Boulesq, the church whose bell-tower is built out of pink sandstone of Saint Laurent d'olt date of 1893.

It was built since 1890 by the inhabitants of the village.

Previously, at the place of the current presbytery, there was a small vault also dedicated to Saint Roch who went back to 1777.

This vault was set up in parish on April 26, 1787 by the bishop of Rodez of the time: Jerome-Marie Champion of Cicé.

The cross with the wheel in Falguières

Located in top of the village, this beautiful pink sandstone cross overhanging a fountain is finely worked.

It carries the date of 1856 and the inscriptions: E J.B., the initials of Enfru Jean Baptist, who was a stonemason.

Civil heritage

The castle

The presence of the castle would go up to the 10th century, period during which many fortifications were built.

Its existence is attested since 1261 in the marriage certificate of Guillemette the Pons de Cayrodes' sister.

The current castle, at least what us remains about it, was completed in 1446.

It results from rehandlings and enlargings carried out on the castle of origin.

In this end of the Middle Ages, the memory of made plunderings a few decades before by the Great Company was always present in the spirits and justified this construction for the protection of the goods and the people.

Here is an old description:

This building forms a quadrilateral oblong and flanked on the southernmost frontage of two grosses  towers (not included crenels).

They have with their external base, ten nine meters of circumference. In the towers are "apartments": four in the East and six in the West.

The thickness of the walls is 1 meter. The frontage of the South east bored of 15 windows. The walls as well as the towers are crenelated.
Ditches made the turn of the castle. In front of the gate are the superimposed stables whose Western frontage has five arcades with semicircular arch and loopholes, resting on large cylindrical columns half.

The castle is built out of schist drowned in the mortar watered with the large sand of Lot river.

This mortar is very hard, because it is easier to cross than to tear off the stone.

The corners of the doors and the windows are in likings variegated, taken with the careers of Capelle Bonance.

In 1329, to facilitate transport of it, the lord of Pomayrols had made build a bridge upon the Lot river which was carried by a rising in 1705.

The building of 1446 will preserve its aspect of origin until 1568. After the passage of Huguenots, the ransacked parts all were not rebuilt.

Murat de Lestang which had functions at the court of Versailles will not remain any more with the castle.

It is a building without maintenance, delivered to the bad weather and the plunderers which is bought during the French revolution by Mr. Aymar de Jabrun.

During the 19th century, Aymar de Jabrun sells the masonry to Mr. Xavier Fournier (craftsman on wood) who will rebuild the parts in ruin.

In the Southern building, it will arrange there workshops at the ground floor and apartments in the stages.

In 1905 it sells with the commune the part located at the East and the contiguous tower. It will arrange there a public school at the ground floor, the residences of the teachers to the 1er stages. In the tower: the town hall.

In 1986, this part was entirely renovated and reconverted in rooms of reception and residences of hiring. A part of angle shelters a museum where a remarkable collection of old agricultural tools is exposed.

Today, in spite of the scars of the history and the successive rehandlings, the whole with always good pace, although not yet protected  with the title from the historic buildings the castle with its two high towers remains a witness always upright of the History of High Rouergue.

The Chipole bridge

It is the third bridge built at this place of the valley;

In 1329, the Lord of Pomayrols of the time made build the first, it was located at the hamlet of Chipole, it was destroyed by one of violent raw which the valleyundergoes during the winter 1705 .

In 1859 a second and transitory bridge were  built again. Builds in precipitation, inaugurated on October 16, 1859, it did not support the first raw arrival and collapsed on January 5, 1860.

The current bridge goes back to 1871, its construction was financed by the State. In the year 2000, it was consolidated and entirely renovated.

Archives

Old pictures:

Parochial registers and of marital status since:

Genealogical examinations:

Municipal deliberations since:

Personalities related to the commune

The canon Jean Pierre Bourgade, (1809-1880) general chaplain of the Navy.

See also
Communes of the Aveyron department

References

External links

 Mairie de Pomayrols (Official website)
 Pomayrols on the website of Institut géographique national

Communes of Aveyron
Aveyron communes articles needing translation from French Wikipedia